Tuxedo Park is a residential neighbourhood in the northeast and northwest quadrants of Calgary, Alberta. The inner city community is bounded to the north by 32 Avenue N, by Edmonton Trail to the east, the Trans-Canada Highway to the south and 2 Street NW to the west. The community is bisected by Centre Street from north to south.

Tuxedo was annexed by the city in 1910 and it was established as a neighbourhood in 1929. It is represented in the Calgary City Council by the Ward 9 councillor.

Demographics

Residents in this community had a median household income of $46,027 in 2005, and there were 21.3% low income residents living in the neighbourhood. As of 2006, 19.2% of the residents were immigrants. A proportion of 51.0% of the buildings were condominiums or apartments, and 53.9% of the housing was used for renting.

Education

Balmoral Junior High public school and St. Paul School (Catholic) are located in Tuxedo Park.  Kindergarten to Grade 6 students attend Buchanan, Rosedale, and Mount View Elementary Schools.  Grades 7-9 students attend G. P. Vanier Junior High School, Balmoral Junior High School and St. Joseph Junior High School (Catholic).  Grades 10-12 students attend either James Fowler High School or Crescent Heights High School.

Transportation

CTrain 
In 2020, Calgary City Council approved the construction of 16 Avenue North Station, part of the Calgary Green Line. The station will be at-grade on Centre Street, between 16 Avenue N - 14 Avenue N. Construction will begin in 2024.

Major Roads:

Centre Street N, cuts through Tuxedo Park (north-south)
Edmonton Trail NE (east border)
16 Avenue N / Trans-Canada Highway (south border)
32 Avenue N (north border)
20 Avenue N (cuts through Tuxedo Park (west-east))
4 Street NW (located nearby to the west)
12 Avenue N (located nearby to the south)

Bus Routes (Calgary Transit, March 2018):

Route 2 Killarney-17th Ave / Mount Pleasant
Route 3 Heritage / Sandstone
Route 4 Huntington
Route 5 North Haven
Route 17 Renfrew / Ramsay
Route 19 16th Avenue North
Route 62 Hidden Valley (Express)
Route 64 MacEwan (Express)
Route 69 Deerfoot Centre
Route 109 Harvest Hills (Express)
Route 116 Coventry Hills (Express)
Route 142 Panorama Hills (Express)
Route 300 BRT Airport / City Centre
Route 301 BRT North / City Centre

See also
List of neighbourhoods in Calgary

References

External links
Tuxedo Park Community Association

Neighbourhoods in Calgary